Boris Becker was the defending champion, but did not participate this year.

Thomas Enqvist won the tournament, beating Arnaud Boetsch in the final, 7–5, 6–4.

Seeds

Draw

Finals

Top half

Bottom half

External links
 Main draw

1995 Stockholm Open
1995 ATP Tour